Vaitupu is a village in Wallis and Futuna. It is located in Hihifo District on the northeast coast of Wallis Island in the South Pacific. Its population according to the 2018 census was 406 people.

References

Populated places in Wallis and Futuna